The 2016 Gran Premio della Costa Etruschi cycling race took place on February 7, 2016, and was won by Nippo's Grega Bole. It was the 21st edition of the Gran Premio della Costa Etruschi race.

General classification

References

2016 UCI Europe Tour
Gran Premio della Costa Etruschi